Reinhardtsgrimma is a former municipality in the district of Weißeritzkreis in Saxony in Germany located near Dresden. On 2 January 2008, it merged into the town Glashütte. Its church features an organ by Gottfried Silbermann.

External links
 Homepage

Glashütte
Former municipalities in Saxony